The Sheephead Mountains are a mountain range in Pershing County, Nevada, USA.

The Sheephead mountains have a peak of 5,896 feet, and are considered to be brushland ecosystems.

References 

Mountain ranges of Pershing County, Nevada
Mountain ranges of Nevada